Leptodactylodon bueanus is a species of frogs in the family Arthroleptidae. It is endemic to western  Cameroon and known from the eastern slope of Mount Cameroon and from Bimbia Hill near Limbe. It was originally described as a subspecies of Leptodactylodon albiventris and is also similar to Leptodactylodon stevarti.

Description
Adult males measure  in snout–vent length. The dorsum is brown anteriorly and beige posteriorly. The thighs are brown. The venter is clear and the throat is blackish with white spots. Gular folds are present. Breeding males have three (but occasionally only 1–2) metacarpal spines.

Habitat and conservation
The tadpoles develop in streams. Leptodactylodon bueanus is locally abundant and is typically found in degraded forest, but requires dense vegetation in order to survive. It is probably threatened by habitat loss caused by smallholder farming activities, subsistence wood extraction, and human settlements. There are no records from protected areas.

References

bueanus
Frogs of Africa
Endemic fauna of Cameroon
Amphibians of Cameroon
Amphibians described in 1981
Taxonomy articles created by Polbot